Kim Wan-seop (born 1963) is a South Korean writer, novelist, journalist, and educator. A native of Gwangju, he participated in the 1980 Gwangju Democratization Movement, and is a critic of his home country's alleged nationalism and fascism.

Life 
Kim was born in Gwangju in 1963. He graduated from Salesian High School in 1982, and entered Seoul National University the same year, majoring in physics and also studying history and political economy. However, he dropped out in 1989 to begin working as a journalist, at first focusing on computers.

He dropped out in the same year of the strike of Kuro-Kuchung. He later began work as a novelist. He lived in Australia between 1996 and 1998.

Political views 
Kim is one of the last survivors of the "Gwangju Democratization Movement's Peoples Army".

Kim is identified in the media as pro-Japanese due to his political positions and alleged glamorization of Japanese colonial rule in Korea, and has been accused of character defamation against various historical Korean nationalists. In 2004, a Seoul prosecutor indicted him for comments he made about Kim Gu. In 2006, Kim Eul-dong, the granddaughter of early 20th-century Korean nationalist Kim Jwa-jin, accused him of defamation of character for comments he made about Kim Jwa-jin in an essay posted on portal site Daum.

Works

See also 
 Park No-ja

References 

1963 births
South Korean writers
South Korean activists
South Korean educators
Anti-fascists
Anti-Korean sentiment
Living people